Igor Kozoš (born 4 August 1974) is a Serbian footballer who plays as a right-back for amateur club Hajduk 1950.

Career
During his journeyman career, Kozoš played for numerous clubs, having multiple stints with Mladost Apatin and Hajduk Kula. He also spent some time abroad in Hungary (Szeged) and Poland (Hutnik Kraków).

References

External links
 
 
 

1974 births
Living people
People from Vrbas, Serbia
Serbia and Montenegro footballers
Serbian footballers
Association football defenders
FK Vojvodina players
FK Hajduk Kula players
FK Mladost Apatin players
Szeged LC footballers
FK Obilić players
Hutnik Nowa Huta players
FK Bačka 1901 players
Second League of Serbia and Montenegro players
First League of Serbia and Montenegro players
Serbian SuperLiga players
Serbia and Montenegro expatriate footballers
Expatriate footballers in Hungary
Expatriate footballers in Poland
Serbia and Montenegro expatriate sportspeople in Hungary
Serbia and Montenegro expatriate sportspeople in Poland